Romário Ricardo da Silva (born 12 December 1990), commonly known as Romarinho, is a Brazilian football player, currently playing as a striker for Ittihad. On 27 June 2012, Romarinho scored the equaliser for Corinthians in the first leg of the 2012 Copa Libertadores Final against Boca Juniors of Argentina.

In 2017, he moved to UAE Gulf League outfit Jazira on a free transfer, after the expiration of his previous contract. He played in the 2017 FIFA Club World Cup where he was the top goalscorer, alongside Cristiano Ronaldo and Maurício Antônio.

Honours

Corinthians
 Copa Libertadores: 2012
 Recopa Sudamericana: 2013
 FIFA Club World Cup: 2012
 Campeonato Paulista: 2013

Jaish
 Qatar Cup: 2014, 2016

Al-Ittihad
Saudi Super Cup: 2022

Individual
 Fans' Asian Champions League XI: 2016
 Saudi Professional League Player of the Month: September 2019,January 2022

Career statistics

References

External links
 Romarinho at playmakerstats.com (English version of ogol.com.br)
 'Vou conquistar a torcida pouco a pouco'

Living people
1990 births
Brazilian footballers
Brazilian expatriate footballers
Rio Branco Esporte Clube players
Clube Atlético Bragantino players
Sport Club Corinthians Paulista players
El Jaish SC players
Al Jazira Club players
Ittihad FC players
Campeonato Brasileiro Série A players
Campeonato Brasileiro Série B players
Copa Libertadores-winning players
Qatar Stars League players
UAE Pro League players
Saudi Professional League players
Expatriate footballers in Qatar
Brazilian expatriate sportspeople in Qatar
Expatriate footballers in the United Arab Emirates
Brazilian expatriate sportspeople in the United Arab Emirates
Expatriate footballers in Saudi Arabia
Brazilian expatriate sportspeople in Saudi Arabia
Footballers from São Paulo (state)
Association football forwards